Wallerawang railway station is a heritage-listed disused railway station located on the Main Western line in Wallerawang, City of Lithgow, New South Wales, Australia. It is also known as Wallerawang Railway Station and yard group. The property was added to the New South Wales State Heritage Register on 2 April 1999.

History
The station opened on 1 March 1870 as the terminus of the Main Western line when it was extended from Bowenfels. On 1 July 1870 the line was extended to Rydal. Originally named Mudgee Road, it was renamed Wallerawang in 1873.

In 1880, work commenced on the new rail line to Mudgee, the first stage of the Gwabegar line.

With the State Rail Authority replacing the Lithgow to Orange and Mudgee services with road coaches, the station closed in May 1989. Road coach services still call opposite the station.

On 24 October 2022, the Deputy Premier Paul Toole announced that Wallerawang Station would be refurbished and reopened as a stop on the twice daily Bathurst Bullet service.

Description 
The complex includes: 
Station buildings
 platform 1 type 1, brick station/residence, 1870
 platform 1 platform awning, 1883
 platform 2 timber waiting shed, 1913
Signal box
 east, 1915
 west, 1915
Goods shed - 84 x 24 side shed corrugated iron, 1882
Platform faces - stone and brick, 1870
Pedestrian bridge to platform 2
Water column up main
Water tank - cast iron tank on metal base
Jib crane - 1882
Upper and lower quadrant signals
Landscaping surrounding the station and yard area
Enamel signs

Heritage listing 
, Wallerawang station and yard group is a major railway junction with excellent examples of buildings from a range of periods, all in good condition and in use. The main station building is the best surviving example of a two-storey residence/station and a rare example in stone. The awning is an unusual one-off structure indicating the importance of the location with the need for additional shelter. The on-platform signal box is a rare surviving example of a large brick and timber box in good condition. The yard structures including the residences, goods shed and signal box are all good examples of various building types and remain as remnants of a larger facility. As a group the site has very high heritage significance.

Wallerawang railway station was listed on the New South Wales State Heritage Register on 2 April 1999 having satisfied the following criteria.

The place possesses uncommon, rare or endangered aspects of the cultural or natural history of New South Wales.

This item is assessed as historically rare. This item is assessed as scientifically rare. This item is assessed as arch. rare. This item is assessed as socially rare.

See also 

List of disused railway stations in regional New South Wales

References

Bibliography

Attribution

External links
Wallerawang station details Transport for New South Wales

New South Wales State Heritage Register
Wallerawang
Articles incorporating text from the New South Wales State Heritage Register
Disused regional railway stations in New South Wales
Railway stations in Australia opened in 1870
Railway stations closed in 1989
Main Western railway line, New South Wales